The 1993–94 Coppa Italia, the 47th Coppa Italia was an Italian Football Federation domestic cup competition won by Sampdoria, who defeated Ancona Calcio in the final 6–1 on aggregate.

First round

Second round 

p=after penalty shoot–out

Round of 16 

p=after penalty shoot–out

Quarter–finals

Semi–finals

Final

First leg

Second leg

Sampdoria won 6–1 on aggregate.

Top goalscorers

References
rsssf.com

Coppa Italia seasons
Coppa Italia, 1993-94
Coppa Italia